The Pléiades constellation is composed of two very-high-resolution optical Earth-imaging satellites. Pléiades-1A and Pléiades-1B provide the coverage of Earth's surface with a repeat cycle of 26 days. Designed as a dual civil/military system, Pléiades will meet the space imagery requirements of European defence as well as civil and commercial needs.

History 
The Pléiades system was designed under the French-Italian ORFEO Programme (Optical and Radar Federated Earth Observation) between 2001 and 2003.

The Pléiades programme was launched in October 2003 with CNES (the French space agency) as the overall system prime contractor and EADS Astrium as the prime contractor for the space segment.

Spot Image is the official and exclusive worldwide distributor of Pléiades products and services under a delegated public service agreement.

Launches 
 Pléiades-1A was launched via a Russian Soyuz ST-A launch vehicle of the Centre Spatial Guyanais, Kourou, French Guiana, on 17 December 2011 at 02:03 UTC.
 Pléiades-1B was launched via a Russian Soyuz ST-A launch vehicle of the Centre Spatial Guyanais, Kourou, French Guiana, on 2 December 2012 at 02:02 UTC.

Technologies

Orbit 
The two satellites operate in the same phased orbit and are offset at 180° to offer a daily revisit capability over any point on the globe. The Pléiades also share the same orbital plane as the SPOT 6 and 7, forming a larger constellation with 4 satellites, 90° apart from one another.
 Orbit: Sun-synchronous, phased, near-circular
 Mean altitude: 695 km

Equipment 
Equipped with technologies like fibre-optic gyroscopes and control moment gyroscopes, Pléiades-HR 1A, and 1B offer roll, pitch, and yaw (slew) agility, enabling the system to maximize the number of acquisitions above a given area.

Agility for Responsive Tasking 
This agility coupled with particularly dynamic image acquisition programming make the Pléiades system very responsive to specific user requirements. Individual user requests was answered in record time, thanks to multiple programming plans per day and a state-of-the-art image processing chain. Performance at a glance:
 Image acquisition anywhere within an 800-km-wide ground strip with 70 cm of resolution
 Along-track stereo and tri-stereo image acquisition
 Single-pass collection of mosaics (strip-mapping) with a footprint up to a square degree
 Maximum theoretical acquisition capacity of 1,000,000 km2 per day and per satellite
 Optimized daily acquisition capacity (taking into account genuine order book, weather constraints, conflicts...) reaching 300,000 km2 per day and per satellite

Products

Ground receiving stations 
When satellite operations begin, four ground receiving stations will be deployed for the direct downlink and archiving of imagery data:
 Two defence centres in France and Spain
 Two civil stations: one in Toulouse (France) and a polar station in Kiruna (Sweden), which receives most of the data

Regional receiving stations (fixed or mobile) are subsequently installed at the request of users.

Uplink Stations 
The Pléiades tasking plan are refreshed and uploaded three times per day, allowing for last minute requests and the ability to utilize up-to-the-minute weather forecasts.
 The Kerguelen Island station uploads the morning pass, over Europe, Africa and the Middle East.
 The Swedish station takes care of midday orbits, over North and South Americas.
 The French station transmits the last tasking plan of the day over Asia and Oceania.

See also 

 Geographic information system (GIS)
 Remote sensing

References

External links 
 Astrium Geo
 ASTRIUM
 CNES
 Gunter's Space Page
  eoportal.org

Reconnaissance satellites of France
Spacecraft launched by Soyuz-2 rockets
Spacecraft launched in 2011
Spacecraft launched in 2012
Earth imaging satellites
Twin satellites
Military equipment introduced in the 2010s